Jacob Sodowski (Jakub Sądowski) was a Polish-American fur trader after whom Sandusky, Ohio might have been named (see also Anthony Sadowski).

In 1770, Jacob Sodowski settled in New York, and his sons were among the first white men to penetrate as far as Kentucky. It is said that Sandusky, Ohio, was named after him.

French maps as early as 1718 identified Sandusky Bay as Lac Sandouské.

References

Polish emigrants to the United States
People of the Province of New York
Virginia colonial people